Vera Zorina (January 2, 1917 – April 9, 2003), born Eva Brigitta Hartwig, was a Norwegian ballerina, theatre and film actress, and choreographer. Today, she is chiefly remembered for her films choreographed by her then-husband George Balanchine. They include the Slaughter on Tenth Avenue sequence from On Your Toes, The Goldwyn Follies, I Was an Adventuress with Erich Von Stroheim and Peter Lorre, Louisiana Purchase with Bob Hope, and dancing to "That Old Black Magic" in Paramount Pictures' Star Spangled Rhythm.

Background
Zorina was born in Berlin, Germany. Her father Fritz Hartwig was a German lapsed Roman Catholic, and her mother Abigail Johanne Wimpelmann (known as Billie Hartwig) was Norwegian and Lutheran. Both were professional singers. Zorina was brought up in Kristiansund, a small coastal town between Trondheim and Bergen, where she debuted as a dancer at the local theatre, Festiviteten. She received her education at the Lyceum for Girls in Berlin and was trained in dance by Olga Preobrajenska and Nicholas Legat.

Career
At age 12, she was presented to Max Reinhardt, who cast her in A Midsummer Night's Dream (1929) and Tales of Hoffmann (1931). A performance at London's Gaiety Theatre won her an invitation to join the Ballet Russe de Monte Carlo in 1933, at which time she adopted the stage name of Vera Zorina. The company only wanted Russian names and she was given a list of 20 and chose the last name because she could pronounce it. A few years later, she attained a lead role in the London production of On Your Toes (1937) and was seen by American film producer Samuel Goldwyn, who signed her to a seven-year film contract. She appeared in seven Hollywood movies between 1938 and 1946.

When she lost the role of Maria in For Whom the Bell Tolls after only two weeks shooting, her film career came to a halt. The Hollywood axe fell on her when co-star Gary Cooper, director Sam Wood, and Ernest Hemingway all preferred Ingrid Bergman.

One of her major stage roles was in the 1938 Rodgers and Hart musical I Married an Angel. As the title character, she played an exquisite angel who descended from heaven to marry a Hungarian banker played by Dennis King, but whose complete lack of human guile presented him with a whole new set of problems. (Jeanette MacDonald had that role in the film version.)

In 1945, she had great success as Ariel in William Shakespeares The Tempest at the Alvin Theatre (now named Neil Simon Theatre) on Broadway. Starting in 1948, Zorina appeared in Arthur Honegger's Joan of Arc at the Stake, playing the title role in the first American performance with the New York Philharmonic under Charles Münch. She subsequently commanded the role many times, notably in the recorded performance from the Royal Festival Hall in June 1966, with the London Symphony Orchestra under Seiji Ozawa. In 1968, she directed Cabaret at the Oslo Nye Teater to great acclaim. Her farewell performance was in Perséphone with New York City Ballet in 1982. In the 1970s, Vera Zorina was appointed director of the Norwegian National Opera and Ballet (Den Norske Opera & Ballet), but withdrew before she officially settled in because of her husband's illness.

She was active with Lincoln Center as an adviser and director and, for several seasons, directed operas at the Santa Fe Opera in New Mexico. In 1986, she completed Zorina, her autobiography.

Personal life
Zorina was married in 1938 to choreographer George Balanchine (her first marriage and his second marriage); the couple divorced in 1946. She danced in productions he choreographed for both stage and screen, including On Your Toes, a Broadway hit later adapted for the screen by Lawrence Riley.

From 1946 her second husband was Columbia Records president Goddard Lieberson until his death on May 29, 1977. They had two sons: Peter Lieberson, a composer, and Jonathan Lieberson. Her final marriage in 1991 was to harpsichordist Paul Wolfe until her death in 2003 at age 86 of undisclosed causes.

Zorina was the grandmother of sisters Elizabeth (Lizzie), Katherine, and Kristina Lieberson, who are now members of the band TEEN.

Filmography

References

Further reading

External links
Photographs and literature
Vera Zorina images
 Collection Guide, Vera Zorina papers, 1910-2001 Houghton Library, Harvard University

Vera Zorina memorabilia collection.

1917 births
2003 deaths
Norwegian ballerinas
Norwegian choreographers
Norwegian emigrants to the United States
Norwegian film actresses
German emigrants to Norway
American ballerinas
American choreographers
American film actresses
People from Kristiansund
21st-century American women
20th-century American ballet dancers